Bang'n on Wax: The Best of the Damu's is a compilation album by rap group, Damu Ridas.  The album was released on February 11, 1997 for Dangerous Records and This Album Contains 11  New Bonus Track Songs And 23 Old Songs For The 3 Previous Albums: This Album Contains 11 Songs For  Damu Ridas, 6 For Bangin' on Wax & 4 For Bangin' on Wax 2... The Saga Continues.

Track listing

Damu Ridas albums
1997 compilation albums